Keba is a rural locality (a village) in Olemskoye Rural Settlement of Leshukonsky District, Arkhangelsk Oblast, Russia. The population was 131 as of 2010.

Geography 
Keba is located 85 km south of Leshukonskoye (the district's administrative centre) by road. Butyrka is the nearest rural locality.

References 

Rural localities in Leshukonsky District
Leshukonsky District